Philipp Roth (1853–1898) was a German cellist.  He was born at Tarnowitz in Prussian Silesia.  His teacher was Robert Hausmann.

References

1853 births
1898 deaths
German classical cellists
19th-century German Jews
People from the Province of Silesia
19th-century German musicians
19th-century classical musicians